Sheikh Khaled bin Mohamed bin Zayed Al Nahyan; born on 8 January 1982, is a government leader and member of Abu Dhabi’s ruling Al Nahyan family. He is the eldest son of Sheikh Mohamed bin Zayed Al Nahyan, President of the UAE.

Khaled is Deputy National Security Advisor. He is also a member of the Abu Dhabi Executive Council and Chairman of both the Abu Dhabi Executive Committee and the Abu Dhabi Executive Office.

Career

Political career 
On 15 February 2016, Khaled was appointed Head of National Security. On 16 January 2017, he was named Deputy National Security Adviser.

He is a member of the Abu Dhabi Executive Council and Chairman of both the Abu Dhabi Executive Committee and the Abu Dhabi Executive Office.

Board memberships 
Sheikh Khaled is a member of Abu Dhabi's Supreme Council for Financial and Economic Affairs, and a member of the board of directors of Abu Dhabi National Oil Company (ADNOC).

He is also the chairman of several boards, including the UAE Genomics Council, the Executive Committee of the board of directors of ADNOC, and the Advanced Technology Research Council (ATRC).

Early life and education 
He is the son of Sheikh Mohamed bin Zayed Al Nahyan, President of United Arab Emirates, and a member of Abu Dhabi's ruling Al Nahyan family. His mother is Sheikha Salama bint Hamdan Al Nahyan. Khaled is the brother of Theyab bin Mohamed bin Zayed Al Nahyan, Chairman of the Abu Dhabi Crown Prince’s Court and Chairman of Etihad Rail.

Pandora papers 
Sheikh Khalid is one of the Emirati figures who are mentioned in the Pandora Papers due to his partnership with an offshore investment company. He involves in these activities through the Desroches Island Limited company of which Khalid is the sole shareholder. His business partners given in the papers include Singapore businessman Ong Beng Seng and Emirati businessman Ali Saeed Juma Albwardy.

Personal life
His wife is Sheikha Fatima bint Suroor Al Nahyan, and they have two daughters and one son.

Ancestry

See also 

 Timeline of Abu Dhabi

References 

Living people
People from Abu Dhabi
Khaled bin Mohamed bin Zayed
Emirati politicians
Children of presidents of the United Arab Emirates
1982 births
People named in the Pandora Papers
Sons of monarchs